Brahim El Bahri (born March 26, 1986 in Taounate, Morocco) is a Moroccan football midfielder. He currently plays for CR Khemis Zemamra.

Career
El Bahri began his career by FAR Rabat was 2006 promoted to first team played here between June 2007, joined than to French Ligue 1 side Le Mans UC 72, who has played 14 games for the reserve team and in January 2008 was promoted to Le Mans.

On 28 January 2009, Le Mans has the 22-year-old Moroccan national team player El Bahri, until the end of the season to give FC Istres.

After playing four years in France, El Bahri returned to Morocco to play for hometown side FUS Rabat in 2011.

International 
He made his first cap for Morocco in the 2010 FIFA World Cup qualification match against Mauritania on 7 June 2008.

International goals
Scores and results list Morocco's goal tally first.

References

External links 
 
 
 
 Brahim El Bahri at Footballdatabase

Moroccan footballers
Morocco international footballers
Moroccan expatriate footballers
1986 births
Living people
Le Mans FC players
FC Istres players
Fath Union Sport players
CS Sfaxien players
Wydad AC players
Chabab Rif Al Hoceima players
Ligue 1 players
Ligue 2 players
Expatriate footballers in France
People from Taounate
Association football midfielders
Moroccan expatriate sportspeople in France
Moroccan expatriate sportspeople in Tunisia
Expatriate footballers in Tunisia
Morocco A' international footballers
2014 African Nations Championship players